A125, A.125 or A-125 may refer to:
 A125 road (Great Britain), a road connecting Romford and Rainham
 Aero A.125, a version of the 1920s Czechoslovakian Aero A.25 military trainer aircraft powered by the less powerful 134 kW (180 hp) Breitfeld & Danek Perun I engine
 Austin A125 Sheerline, a 1947 British luxury car 
 HMAS Toowoomba (J157/B251/A125), a 1941 Royal Australian Navy Bathurst class corvette